The Mirror of Love is an epic poem by Alan Moore, written in the form of a romantic letter. Sappho, Michelangelo, Shakespeare, Emily Dickinson, Oscar Wilde, and many others are woven into this rich, visceral piece, which documents the history of same-sex love throughout mankind's history, and comments on its modern-day state. It originally began as a part of the AARGH! Anthology in 1988. AARGH! [Artists Against Rampant Government Homophobia] was a comic book protest against Britain's proposed anti-gay Section 28. In 2004, Moore teamed up with illustrator José Villarrubia, and the duo re-released the work, adding photographs to each poetic passage. It was translated and published in French as Le Miroir de l'amour (November 2006), by Carabas Revolution, in Italian as Lo Specchio dell'Amore (September 2008) by Edizioni BD  and in Spanish as El Espejo del amor (November 2008) by Editorial Kraken. In 2020 Giangiacomo Feltrinelli Editori published a new edition with a new Italian translation by Marco Rosary. It was also converted into a stage production directed by David Drake (actor).

References

External links
Top Shelf catalog 
Greenman review 
Kittysneezes review
Comicbookbin.com interview with José Villarrubia.

Top Shelf Productions titles
Books by Alan Moore
LGBT poetry
2004 books
2000s LGBT literature
LGBT literature in the United Kingdom